Queensway is an area and a road in Wellingborough, Northamptonshire, running north–south between Hardwick Road and Northampton Road. Queensway, along with Kingsway and Gleneagles Drive, acts as an inner bypass of central Wellingborough, making it one of the most important and busiest roads in the town. Colloquially referred to as 'Queens', the estate is situated on the west side of Wellingborough town. The area had a population of 5,818 at the 2011 census.

History 
Queensway was significantly expanded in the 60s-70s to re-house overspill population from London. Prior to this expansion, Queensway was a medium-sized council estate, with predominantly semi-detached council houses, with a large portion of the area consisting of green land and fields. In 2015, the Queensway area faced a large amount of regeneration following the ownership of Wellingborough social housing being transferred from Wellingborough Council to Wellingborough Homes.(Now Greatwell Homes).

Crime and poverty 
Queensway for a significant period of time has been notorious for gang related crime and violence. In 2021, Queensway was one of the 225 neighborhoods across the UK identified as being 'left behind' by both the government and the police.

Public transportation 
The area is served by Stagecoach's W1 bus.

Politics 
The Queensway ward is represented by Sylvia Erskine (Labour), Adam Henley (Labour) and Silvie Sterland (Conservative). The ward forms part of the parliamentary constituency of Wellingborough and the MP is Peter Bone (Conservative).

References

External links 
 Borough Council of Wellingborough

Wellingborough